The Church of Our Saviour, located at 65 East Holister Street in the Mount Auburn neighborhood of Cincinnati, Ohio, is a parish of the Episcopal Diocese of Southern Ohio. The parish's historic stone church was built in 1877 in the Gothic Revival style. Cincinnati annexed Mount Auburn in 1849.

The congregation has, in recent generations, worked for social justice and since the early 1970s, the Church of Our Saviour has also been intentionally open and affirming towards its gay and lesbian members. For 20 years, Cincinnati's Metropolitan Community Church used facilities at the church for worship and other activities. Recently the congregation has reached out to the Latino community, offering bilingual Mass and services to communities of recent immigrants.

The first Head Start program in Mount Auburn began at the church, as did the Mount Auburn Community Council, the Bethany House (a shelter for homeless mothers and children) in the Rectory, and AIDS Volunteers of Cincinnati (AVOC).

The church draws active members from as far away as Dayton, Ohio and Northern Kentucky.

See also

 Church of Our Saviour (disambiguation)

References

External links
 Church of Our Saviour website
Church of Our Saviour history (mostly recent)
 Church of Our Saviour "takin' it to the streets" - street ministry

Episcopal churches in Ohio
Churches in Cincinnati